Thomas Spring of Castlemaine (died 1597) was an English Protestant soldier, politician and Constable of Castle Maine in County Kerry, Ireland.

Biography
Thomas Spring was born in Lavenham, Suffolk, the son of Robert Spring. He was the grandson of Thomas Spring of Lavenham, the richest merchant in England during the early 1500s.

Spring was an officer in the army of Elizabeth I during the Tudor conquest of Ireland. He served with distinction, coming to the attention of Walter Raleigh who lobbied Sir Michael Hicks for a reward for Spring. As part of the Plantation of Munster he was granted over 3,000 acres of land in County Kerry in 1578. In 1584, he was appointed Constable of Castle Maine, with responsibility for maintaining English royal authority over the locality. He was accorded the right to hold several country fairs as a source of income and was in control of collecting tolls and taxes for the Crown. His land increased to approximately 6,000 acres when, on 12 December 1588, he was granted the estates of Killagha Abbey, which had been seized by The Crown during the dissolution of the monasteries. Spring was instructed to rebuild the abbey in a castle-like manner, so that it could serve as a defensive structure. 

From 1585 to 1586 Spring was the Member of Parliament for Kerry in the Irish House of Commons and he served as High Sheriff of Kerry in 1592. He was the first of the Spring family to settle in Ireland.

Spring married Annabelle Browne, the daughter of John Browne, Master of Awney, Co.Limerick, with whom he had two sons and five daughters.  His eldest son, Thomas, was a practising lawyer. His younger son, Walter, served as High Sheriff of Kerry in 1609. Walter's grandson was Walter Spring, who lost much of the family's Irish estate during the Irish Confederate Wars. Of Thomas's daughters, Alice married Colonel James Ryves, elder brother of Sir William Ryves and Sir Thomas Ryves.

Ancestry

References

Year of birth uncertain
1597 deaths
16th-century English people
High Sheriffs of Kerry
Irish MPs 1585–1586
People from Lavenham
People of Elizabethan Ireland
People of the Nine Years' War (Ireland)
People of the Second Desmond Rebellion
Thomas
Members of the Parliament of Ireland (pre-1801) for County Kerry constituencies